Alfonso Pinzón (born 27 November 1972) is a Spanish heavy metal drummer. He is known for his work in the bands Dia de los Meurtos and Agony and for co-founding the Festival del Diablo in Colombia.

Early life and education
Pinzón was born in Barcelona, Spain, and grew up in Germany.

Career
Pinzón cofounded the Colombian thrash band Agony in 1992, and performed as a drummer in the band. Agony performed several times in Colombia's Rock al Parque festival and released an album entitled Millennium. The band moved to Los Angeles in 1999 and played in bars and clubs.  In 2005, with Agony in hiatus, Pinzon cofounded the Los Angeles extreme metal band Dia De Los Muertos with Andres Jaramillo and also served as drummer in that band.

In 2007 the band Agony reactivated, and Pinzón performed with them as the headlined the Rock al Parque festival.

Pinzón produced most of the band's recordings.  He also produced two albums for the American black metal band Inquisition: Ominous Doctrines of the Perpetual Mystical Macrocosm (2011) and Obscure Verses for the Multiverse (2013).

In 2014, still living in the United States, Pinzón and his band released an album, No Money, No Fiesta; that year Pinzón also co-founded the Festival del Diablo in Bogota, Colombia, with Jan Pablo Chaparro.

With Dia de los Muertos, Pinzón performed at the Rock al Parque in Colombia; in 2016 the band released an EP.

Pinzon continued to co-organize and perform in the Festival del Diablo as recently as 2017. That year he wrote an article in Rolling Stone magazine about Byzantine rock music.

Discography

with Agony
 Agony (1994)
 Live All the Time (1995)
 Millennium (1996)
 Reborn (2002)
 The Devil's Breath (2009)

with Dia de los Muertos
 Day of the Dead (2005)
 Satanico - Dramatico (2011)
 No Money - No Fiesta (2014)

with Battle Dagorath
 Eternal Throne

with Sin Salida
 Yo Me Llamo Hardcore (2012)
 El Propio (EP) (2013)

Albums produced
 Inquisition - Ominous Doctrines of the Perpetual Mystical Macrocosm (2011) 
 Inquisition - Obscure Verses for the Multiverse (2013)

References

1972 births
Living people
Spanish drummers
Musicians from Barcelona
Spanish expatriates in Germany
Spanish expatriates in the United States
21st-century drummers